Gudigar or Gudigara are a group of people residing in the state of Karnataka, India. Their traditional profession was to build temples and places of worship. The skills were passed on only in the families of Gudigaras. Official website: https://www.gudigars.com/

External links 
 The Gudigars of Kanara

Carpenter castes
Social groups of Karnataka